Coolestown is a barony in County Offaly (formerly King's County), Republic of Ireland.

Etymology
Coolestown derives its name from Coolestown (Irish Baile an Chúlaígh), a former name of Edenderry, from the Cooley/Cowley/Colley family who ruled it from 1560.

Location

Coolestown is located in easternmost County Offaly. The Philipstown River flows through it.

History
Coolestown was part of the ancient divisions known as Túath Dá Maige (túath of the Two Plains), and Ferran Uí Muircáin lying east of the Figile River. The Uí Muircáin (Morahan, Moran) were a sub-sept of Clan Colgan. The tuath of Mag Lége is also noted here with its association to the Uí Failge septs of the Uí Onchon and Uí Cellaig (O'Kelly).

List of settlements

Below is a list of settlements in Coolestown:
Bracknagh
Clonbollogue
Edenderry

References

Baronies of County Offaly